When Saturday Comes (WSC) is a monthly magazine about football, first published in London in 1986. "It aims to provide a voice for intelligent football supporters, offering both a serious and humorous view of the sport, covering all the topics that fans are likely to talk about, whether serious or trivial." WSC is still edited by Andy Lyons, who co-founded the magazine with Mike Ticher.

History
The magazine started out in 1986 as a bi-monthly, independently published fanzine. However, by 1988 it had developed and come to prominence, being available in newsagents nationwide.

The following year its profile was raised again by its coverage of the Albania vs. England World Cup qualifying match, and its circulation reached 20,000.

In the early 1990s the magazine began to take on advertising, and expanded to 48 pages. In 1995, the magazine moved to colour printing.

Writers
While the magazine now employs professional writers (the September 2009 issue credited 15 journalists as being "regular contributors") it still commissions articles by fans. A number of guest writers have also written for the magazine, including Cris Freddi, Nick Hornby and Simon Kuper.

The WSC website lists 408 writers.

Books
In the 2000s, WSC branched out into book publishing. WSC Books has published 14 books, including Tor!, a history of German football.

References

External links
WSC official website
 Articles marking the 25th year of publication were published in April 2011 by The Guardian and Independent newspapers

1986 establishments in England
Association football magazines
Association football supporters
Bi-monthly magazines published in the United Kingdom
Monthly magazines published in the United Kingdom
Sports magazines published in the United Kingdom
Football mass media in the United Kingdom
Magazines published in London
Magazines established in 1986